Fiona Johnston (born 3 February 1966) is a British rower. She competed in the women's coxed four event at the 1988 Summer Olympics.

Rowing career
Johnston was part of the coxless pairs crew, with Belinda Holmes that won the national title rowing for a Marlow and Weybridge Ladies composite, at the 1985 National Rowing Championships.

She represented England and won two silver medals in the coxless pair with Pauline Bird and the eight, at the 1986 Commonwealth Games in Edinburgh, Scotland.

In 1988 she was selected for the Great Britain team at the 1988 Olympics. She competed in the women's coxed four with Joanne Gough, Kate Grose, Susan Smith and Alison Norrish finishing in sixth place. Johnston also represented Great Britain at three World Rowing Championships.

References

External links
 

1966 births
Living people
British female rowers
Olympic rowers of Great Britain
Rowers at the 1988 Summer Olympics
People from Morpeth, Northumberland
Sportspeople from Northumberland
Commonwealth Games medallists in rowing
Commonwealth Games silver medallists for England
Rowers at the 1986 Commonwealth Games
Medallists at the 1986 Commonwealth Games